The Strathdearn Cup is a knock-out competition in the sport of shinty. The present holders are Lovat Shinty Club.

It is played for by reserve-level teams from the North of Scotland, that is all teams playing in North Division Two and Three as well as non-league teams. 

It was first played for in 1911 and was originally administered by the Strathdearn Camanachd Association but it is now run under the auspices of the Camanachd Association.  There is also a Strathdearn Six a-side Trophy for players at Under-17 level.

As of 2010, the opening rounds of the cup were played midweek, in order to reduce the backlog of fixtures that regularly afflicted shinty.  This experiment did not last the season.

In 2014, a Strathdearn Plate was introduced for teams knocked out in the first round of the competition.

Winners
2022 Newtonmore 7, Lovat 1 
2021 Lovat 4, Newtonmore 4 AET, Lovat won on Penalties 
2019 Fort William 4, Newtonmore 0
2018 Newtonmore 4, Fort William 0
2017 Kingussie 4, Newtonmore 2
2016 Lochcarron 4, Glenurquhart 1
2015 Newtonmore 3, Glengarry 1
2014 Newtonmore 3, Skye 2
2013 Lovat
2012 Beauly
2011 Newtonmore
2010 Glenurquhart
2009 Fort William
2008 Fort William
2007 Kilmallie
2006 Newtonmore
2005 Newtonmore
2004 Kilmallie
2003 Newtonmore
2002 Glenurquhart
2001 Kingussie
2000 Skye Camanachd
1999 Newtonmore
1998 Glengarry
1997 Glengarry
1996 Kingussie
1995 Kingussie
1994 Lochcarron
1993 Newtonmore
1992 Kingussie
1991 Kingussie
1990 Kingussie
1988 Kingussie
1987 Kingussie
1986 Skye Camanachd
1985 Kingussie
1984 Newtonmore
1983 Lochcarron
1982 Strathglass
1981 Newtonmore
1980 Caberfeidh
1979 Aberdeen University
1978 Aberdeen University
1977 Glenurquhart
1976 Kinlochshiel
1975 Kinlochshiel
1974 Newtonmore
1973 Aberdeen University
1972 Glenurquhart
1971 Ballachullish
1970 Lochcarron
1969 Lochcarron
1968 Lochcarron
1967 Strathglass
1966 Kinlochshiel
1965 Lochaber
1964 Boleskine
1963 Newtonmore
1962 Glenurquhart
1961 Kinlochshiel
1960 Glenurquhart
1959 Lochcarron
1958 Lochcarron
1957 Kilmallie
1956 Beauly
1955 Beauly
1954 Beauly
1953 Newtonmore
1952 Beauly
1951 Kingussie
1950 Straths Athletic
1949 Newtonmore
1948 Kilmallie
1940 - 1947 No Competition
1939 Lochcarron
1938 Lovat
1937 Lochcarron
1936 Lovat
1935 Caberfeidh
1934 Foyers
1933 Strathconon
1932 Strathconon
1931 Strathconon
1930 Strathdearn
1929 Strathglass
1928 Caberfeidh
1927 Caberfeidh
1926 Foyers
1925 Foyers
1924 Lovat
1923 Beauly
1922 Stratherrick
1921 Grantown on Spey
1920 Stratherrick
1914 Duthil
1913 Foyers
1912 Foyers
1911 Inverness

Wins by Clubs

Shinty competitions
1911 establishments in Scotland